Kalim Khawaja Ghani (1931 – 27 May 2003) was a Pakistani hurdler. He competed in the men's 110 metres hurdles at the 1956 Summer Olympics.

References

External links
 

1931 births
2003 deaths
Athletes (track and field) at the 1956 Summer Olympics
Pakistani male hurdlers
Olympic athletes of Pakistan
Place of birth missing